Akhil Katyal (born 1985 in Bareilly, Uttar Pradesh) is an Indian poet, translator, scholar and a queer activist.

Career

Katyal has published three books of poems: Like Blood on the Bitten Tongue: Delhi Poems, How Many Countries Does the Indus Cross, and Night Charge Extra. During fall 2016, he was an International Writing Fellow at the University of Iowa. He was the recipient of the Vijay Nambisan Poetry Fellowship for the year 2021. In 2018, he translated Ravish Kumar's book of Hindi poems Ishq Mein Shahar Hona as A City Happens in Love. In 2020, he co-edited The World that Belongs to Us: An Anthology of Queer Poetry from South Asia. His work appears in Jeet Thayil (ed.) The Penguin Book of Indian Poets (2022). In the summer of 2022, he guest edited a special issue on 'New Indian English Poetry' for Poetry at Sangam.

Katyal is from Lucknow, Uttar Pradesh and teaches creative writing at Ambedkar University Delhi.

References 

1985 births
Living people
Activists from Delhi
Writers from Lucknow
Poets from Delhi
Poets from Uttar Pradesh
Queer writers
21st-century LGBT people